R5 may refer to:

Roads or Railroads
 Autopista Radial R-5, a Spanish radial motorway
 R5 expressway (Slovakia)
 Radial Road 5 or R-5, an arterial road of Manila, Philippines
 Line R5, a commuter rail service on the Llobregat–Anoia Line, in Barcelona, Catalonia, Spain
 R5 Doylestown, a rail line in Philadelphia, USA
 R5 Paoli-Thorndale, a rail line in Philadelphia, USA

Ships
 HMS Invincible (R05), a 1980 British Royal Navy light aircraft carrier
 HMS Urania (R05), a World War II British Royal Navy U-class destroyer
 USS R-5 (SS-82), a 1918 R-class coastal and harbor defense submarine of the United States Navy

Cars
 Jaguar R5, a Jaguar Racing car for the 2004 Formula One season
 Renault 5, a French automobile
 R5 (rallying) a class within Group R regulations for rallying

Aircraft
 Kinner R-5, a popular engine for light general and sport aircraft
 Polikarpov R-5, a reconnaissance biplane widespread in the Soviet Union before World War II
 Sikorsky R-5, an early USAF designation of Sikorsky S-51 helicopter, changed to H-5
 Thomas-Morse R-5, a 1920s American racing aircraft

Buildings
Regjeringskvartalet, a building in the Norwegian Government quarter (Norw. Regjeringskvartalet)

Weapons
 R5 assault rifle, a variant of the South African R4 assault rifle compact carbine
 R-5 (missile), a theatre ballistic missile developed by the Soviet Union during the Cold War

Medicine and chemistry
 R5 virus, a form of HIV tropism
 ATC code R05 Cough and cold preparations, a subgroup of the Anatomical Therapeutic Chemical Classification System
 Cough ICD-10
 R5: Heating may cause an explosion, a risk phrase in chemistry
 receptor 5, the fifth in line of a series of cellular receptors, generally at the end of an acronym

Other uses
 R5 (band), an American pop-rock band
 R5 (bootleg), a copy of a movie made with a telecine machine from an analog source
 Region 5, the DVD region code for most of Africa, Asia, and the former Soviet Union
 BBC Radio Five Live, a British radio station
 Jordan Aviation, IATA airline designator
 Malta Air Charter, former IATA airline designator
 R5 series of preferred numbers
 Radeon R5, graphics processing units in the AMD Radeon Rx 200 Series
 a type of droid from Star Wars, similar to R2-D2: see List of Star Wars characters#R
 R5 Hastings Street, an express bus service in Metro Vancouver, British Columbia, Canada
 Canon EOS R5, a Canon full-frame mirrorless interchangeable-lens camera